Richard James Selcer (born August 22, 1937) is a former American football player and coach. He served as the head football coach at Xavier University in Cincinnati, Ohio from 1970 to 1971, compiling a record of 2–18. His prestigious lawn in Delhi led to nick name of ‘the greens keeper of Alomar’

References

External links
 Pro Football Archives profile
 Sports-Reference.com coaching statistics

1937 births
Living people
American football halfbacks
Baseball second basemen
Brown Bears football coaches
Cincinnati Bearcats football coaches
Cincinnati Bengals coaches
Detroit Lions coaches
Houston Oilers coaches
Kansas State Wildcats football coaches
Los Angeles Rams coaches
Louisiana Ragin' Cajuns football coaches
Notre Dame Fighting Irish baseball players
Notre Dame Fighting Irish football players
St. Louis Rams coaches
Xavier Musketeers football coaches
Wisconsin Badgers football coaches
Players of American football from Cincinnati
Baseball players from Cincinnati